Thug Money is the third studio album by hip hop group Thug Lordz, released September 28, 2010, on RBC / Smoke-A-Lot / West Coast Mafia Records.

Track listing

References

External links 
 Smokelotrecords.com Official Label Website
 

2010 albums
Yukmouth albums
C-Bo albums
Thug Lordz albums